The 2016 Scandinavian Touring Car Championship was the sixth Scandinavian Touring Car Championship season. The season started at Skövde Airport on May 1 and ended at Ring Knutstorp on September 24, after seven rounds.

Teams and drivers
All teams are Swedish-registered.

Calendar

Race calendar and results
All rounds were held in Sweden.

Championship standings

Drivers' Championship

Notes:
† — Drivers did not finish the race, but were classified as they completed over 70% of the race distance.

Teams' Championship

References

External links

2016 in motorsport
2016 in Swedish motorsport